The Landlord and Tenant Act 1730 (4 Geo 2 c 28) is an Act of the Parliament of Great Britain that regulates certain aspects of the relationship between tenants and their landlords.

The short title of this Act is sometimes abbreviated to LTA 1730.

It has been held that this Act and the Distress for Rent Act 1737 (11 Geo 2 c 19) are to be read as one.

Sections 1 to 5 and 7 of the Irish Act 11 Anne c 2 (Ir) (1712), sometimes called the Distress for Rent (Ireland) Act 1712 or the Distress for Rent Act (Ireland) 1712 corresponded to sections 1 to 5 of the Landlord and Tenant Act 1730.

Section 1
In this section, the words from "whereunto the defendant" to the end were repealed by section 1 of, and the First Schedule to, the Statute Law Revision Act 1948.

Sections 2 to 4
These sections were repealed by section 1 of, and the Schedule to, the Statute Law Revision Act 1867, because they had been virtually repealed by sections 210 to 212 of the Common Law Procedure Act 1852 (15 & 16 Vict c 76).

Section 5
This section was repealed by sections 86 and 146 of, and paragraph 3 of Schedule 14 to, and Part 4 of Schedule 23 to, the Tribunals, Courts and Enforcement Act 2007.

Section 7 of the Act 11 Anne c 2 (Ir) corresponded to this section.

Section 6
This section was repealed by section 207 of, and the Seventh Schedule to the Law of Property Act 1925 (15 & 16 Geo 5 c 20).

Section 7
This section provides that the Act does not extend to Scotland.

References
R T Hunter. A Guide to the Law of Distress for Rent, Poor Rates, Land Tax, and to the Recovery of Gas Rents, Water Rates, Etc: Also Replevin, Recovery of Possession of Tenements, and Kindred Subjects. 10th Ed. Waterlow and Sons. 1911. pp 45, 46, 223 to 226 and 235.
Joseph Chitty. A Collection of Statutes of Practical Utility. 1st Ed. William Benning. 1829. Vol 1. Part 2. pp 666 to 668.
Welsby and Beavan. Chitty's Collection of Statutes. 2nd Ed. 1851. Vol 2. pp 776 to 780.
Welsby and Beavan. Chitty's Collection of Statutes. 3rd Ed. 1865. Vol 2. pp 1109 to 1115.
Lely. Chitty's Collection of Statutes of Practical Utility. 4th Ed. 1880. Vol 3. pp 1275 to 1278.
Lely. The Statutes of Practical Utility. (Chitty's Statutes). 5th Ed. 1895. Vol 6. Title "Landlord and Tenant". pp 20 to 23. See also pp 58 to 60.
William Hanbury Aggs. "The Landlord and Tenant Act, 1730". Chitty's Statutes of Practical Utility. 6th Ed. Sweet and Maxwell. 1912.Vol 7. pp 446 to 448.
"The Landlord and Tenant Act, 1730". Halsbury's Statutes of England. (The Complete Statutes of England). Butterworth & Company (Publishers) Limited. 1929. Vol 10. pp 320 to 322. See also preliminary note at p 305. 
"The Landlord and Tenant Act 1730". Halsbury's Statutes of England. 3rd Ed. 1970. Vol 18. pp 416 to 418. See also preliminary note at p 389.
Hammond and Granger (eds). A Collection of Statutes connected with the General Administration of the Law. 1836. Vol 4. pp 165 to 169.
Hudson. The Statute Law of Ireland and England, respecting Actions, Suits, and Proceedings, whether in the Superior or Inferior Courts, between Landlord and Tenant. 1829. pp 11, 25, 35, 46, 47, 50, 51, 38, 112, 125, 212 and 216.
Bullen. A Practical Treatise on the Law of Distress for Rent. 1842. pp 15, 29, 32, 49 to 51, 54, 58, 69, 78, 80, 115, 116, 122, 151, 168, 169 and 172.
Oldham and Foster. The Law of Distress. 1886. pp 14, 16, 18, 19, 38, 40, 48, 49, 60, 64, 80, 107, 126, 215 and 253.
Bradby. A Treatise on the Law of Distresses. 1808. London edition page numbers 35, 68, 72, 83, 89, 96, 100, 104 and 114. At p 36 etc in Albany edition.
Sparkes. A New Landlord and Tenant. 2001. pp 299, 602, 618, 648, 796 and 816.
Hill and Redman's Law of Landlord and Tenant. 14th Ed. 1964. pp 360, 407, 444, 528, 615, 617 and passim.
Woodfall's Law of Landlord and Tenant. 14th Ed. 1889. pp 321, 347, 387, 393, 430, 431, 440, 442, 444, 446, 456, 492, 562 and 771.
Coote. A Treatise on the Law of Landlord and Tenant. 1840. pp 28, 128, 175, 207, 367, 385, 404 to 407, 410, 427, 428, 505, 577 to 582, 658.
John William Smith and Frederic Philip Maude. The Law of Landlord and Tenant. 1855. pp 89, 90, 120, 150, 233 and 244.
Claydon. A Treatise on the Law of Landlord and Tenant. pp 142, 146, 147, 161, 167, 168, 203, 222, 226, 228, 348, 349 and 369 to 373.
Fawcett. A Compendium of the Law of Landlord and Tenant. 1871. pp 159, 282 and 302.
Cheshire and Burn's Modern Law of Real Property. 18th Ed. 2011. pp 204, 271, 284, 780 and 786.
Bingham. A Treatise on the Law of Real Property. 1868. pp 376, 381 and 563.
Halsbury's Laws of England. 1st Ed. Butterworth & Co.
1909. Vol 8. Title "Copyholds". pp 59 and 459.
1910. Vol 11. Title "Distress". pp 120, 125, 127, 131, 152 and 180.
1911. Vol 18. Title "Landlord and tenant". pp 406, 465, 536, 545, 552, 554 and 555.
Halsbury's Laws of England. 2nd Ed. 1936. Vol 20. pp 84, 158, 252, 277, 278 and passim.
The Digest. 1992. Vol 31(3). pp 122 to 124, 176, 177 and 260.
Jenks. A Digest of English Civil Law. 1905, 1911, 1912   . pp 83, 627, 634, 737, 739, 764, 973 and 993. 2nd Ed. Butterworth & Co. London. 1921. Volume 1. pp 83, 627, 628, 634, 737, 739, 764, 973 and 993.
Mews. A Digest of the Reported Decisions of the Courts of Common Law, Bankruptcy, Probate, Admiralty, and Divorce, . . . From 1756 to 1883 inclusive. 1884. Vol 3. Cols 456, 457, 461, 840, 857 to 860 and 1051.
Harrison's Analytical Digest. 3rd Ed. 1844. Vol 2. Cols 2451, 2616, 2636, 2637, 2673, 3257, 3606 to 3608, 3618, 3619, 3634, 3649 to 3651 and 5421.
A J Bradbrook, "The Actions for Double Rent and Double Value against Overholding Tenants" (1977 to 1978) 13 University of Western Australia Law Review 420 HeinOnline AustLII

Great Britain Acts of Parliament 1730
Landlord–tenant law